The Arts Desk (theartsdesk.com) is a British arts journalism website containing reviews, interviews, news, and other content related to music, theatre, television, films, and other art forms written by journalists from a variety of traditional and web-based publications.

It launched in September 2009 as a shareholder collective. From 2010 to 2013, its honorary chairman was Sir John Tusa, former managing director of the BBC World Service and of the Barbican Centre.

In 2012, it won an Online Media Award as the best specialist journalism site, jointly with the website for The Economist.

Notable contributors to the website include; Aleks Sierz, Jasper Rees, Matt Wolf, Ismene Brown, Joe Muggs, Tom Birchenough, David Nice, Kieron Tyler, and Alexandra Coghlan.

References

External links
 

British entertainment websites
Internet properties established in 2009
Theatre information and review websites